Dulal Chandra Das (Bengali : দুলাল চন্দ্র দাস) is an Indian politician, who is presently serving as the chairman of Maheshtala Municipality and second time member of West Bengal Legislative Assembly from Maheshtala (Vidhan Sabha constituency).

References

Living people
1945 births
Indian politicians